Sport Club Corinthians Paulista, abbreviated as either S.C. Corinthians Paulista or S.C.C.P., is a Brazilian men's professional basketball club that is based in São Paulo, Brazil. It is a part of the multi-sports club S.C. Corinthians Paulista.

History
Corinthians' basketball section was founded in 1928. The club won the Brazilian Championship title 4 times, in the years 1965, 1966, 1969, and 1996. They also won the South American Club Championship three times, in the years 1965, 1966 and 1969. The club also won the 1965 FIBA Intercontinental Cup Test Tournament.

The club has also played in the current top level professional Brazilian League, the NBB, starting with the 2018–19 season.

Roster

Current roster

Arena
Corinthians plays its home games at the 7,000 seat Ginásio Poliesportivo Wlamir Marques, which is named after the club's former player, Wlamir Marques.

Honors and titles

Worldwide
 FIBA Intercontinental Cup
 Champions (1): 1965 (test edition)
 Runners-up (1): 1966
 Third place (1): 1970
 Fourth place (2): 1967, 1986

Continental
 South American Club Championship
 Champions (3): 1965, 1966, 1969
 FIBA South American League
 Runners-up (3): 1996, 1997, 2019

National
 Brazilian Championship
 Champions (4): 1965, 1966, 1969, 1996
 Runners-up (5): 1967, 1968, 1970, 1983, 1986 (I)
 Brazilian second division
 Champions (1): 2018

Regional
 São Paulo State Championship
 Champions (14): 1935, 1939, 1947, 1951, 1952, 1954, 1955, 1964, 1965, 1966, 1968, 1969, 1983, 1985
 Runners-up (4): 1967, 1982, 1984, 2003, 2019

Retired numbers

Notable players

  Eduardo Agra
  Israel Andrade
  José Aparecido
  Emil Assad Rached
  Edson Bispo
  Fúlvio de Assis
  Josuel dos Santos
  Rosa Branca
  Wagner da Silva
  Zé Geraldo
  Guilherme Giovannoni
  Marquinhos Leite
  Bira Maciel
  Wlamir Marques
  Fernando Minucci
  Victor Mirshauswka
  Adilson Nascimento
  Amaury Pasos
  Hélio Rubens
  Oscar Schmidt 
  Humberto Silva
  Edvar Simões
  Marcel Souza
  Gerson Victalino
  Marcelo Vido
  Marquinhos Vieira
  Paulinho Villas Boas
  Mario Butler
  James Carter
  Luciano Parodi
  Kyle Fuller
  Rocky Smith

Notable coaches
  Moacyr Daiuto
  Wlamir Marques
  Cláudio Mortari
  Flor Meléndez

See also

 Corinthians
 Corinthians (women's football)
 Corinthians (futsal)
 Corinthians (beach soccer)
 Corinthians Steamrollers (american football)
 Corinthians (rugby)

References

External links
Official website 
LNB.com Team Profile 
Latinbasket.com Team Profile

Basketball teams in Brazil
Basketball teams in São Paulo
Basketball teams established in 1928
Novo Basquete Brasil